A snake handler is a person who professionally handles and works with snakes. Snake handlers typically work in snake farms alongside herpetologists, and as zookeepers and in animal control services. Snake-handling skills are also employed by first responders, park rangers, and military personnel.

References

Animal care occupations
Snakes and humans